John Alexander Logan , SC (born 6 March 1956) is a judge of the Federal Court of Australia, President of the Defence Force Discipline Appeal Tribunal, a Deputy President of the Administrative Appeals Tribunal and judge of the Supreme and National Courts of Papua New Guinea.

Early life and education

John Logan commenced at Brisbane Grammar School in January 1968, graduating in 1972, and then attended the University of Queensland graduating with a Bachelor of Economics and a Bachelor of Laws.

Legal career 

Logan was admitted to the Queensland Bar in 1980 began his legal career in the Commonwealth Crown Solicitor's office in Brisbane where he became the Principal Legal Officer in charge of the Prosecutions Section. He later commenced private practice at the Queensland Bar in 1984, and was appointed Senior Counsel in 1999.

Logan was appointed a Judge of the Federal Court of Australia on 27 September 2007. He is the President of the Defence Force Discipline Appeal Tribunal (formerly a member of the Tribunal from 1 September 2011), a Deputy President of the Administrative Appeals Tribunal, and a Judge of the Supreme and National Courts of Papua New Guinea. He also serves a member on the board of directors of the Papua New Guinea Centre for Judicial Excellence.

See also

List of Judges of the Federal Court of Australia

References 

Living people
Australian judges on the courts of Papua New Guinea
People from Brisbane
Judges of the Federal Court of Australia
1956 births
Australian Senior Counsel